La Maison du canal (The House by the Canal) is a Franco-Belgian telefilm, directed by Alain Berliner, released in 2003.  It is based on a novel by Georges Simenon. Its running time is 94 minutes.

Technical details
 Director: Alain Berliner
 Written : Dominique Garnier and Alain Berliner, based on the novel by Georges Simenon
 Music : Vincent D'Hondt
 Date of release: 24 February 2003

Starring
 Isild Le Besco : Edmée
 Corentin Lobet :  Jeff
 Nicolas Buysse : Fred
 Jean-Pierre Cassel : Louis
 Gert Portael : Jeanne
 Circé Lethem : Mia
 Joyce Bachely : Mieke
 Camie Boel : Alice
 Luc Bromagne : Le docteur
 Sébastien Waroquier : André
 Michel Angely : Le père
 Daniel Vidovsky : Le jeune homme

References

External links
IMDb

French television films
2003 films
Films directed by Alain Berliner
Films based on Belgian novels
Films based on works by Georges Simenon
Television shows based on works by Georges Simenon